HSI may refer to:

Science and technology
 Hardware Security Integration
HSI color space, used in computer vision applications
 Heterosubtypic immunity
 High Speed Interconnect, a Nvidia computer chip
 Horizontal shaft impactor, a type of rock crusher
 Horizontal situation indicator, an aircraft instrument
 Hurricane Severity Index
 Hyperspectral imaging

Other uses
  (surname), various Chinese surnames, romanized  in Pinyin
 HSI (track team)
 Croatian Syrmian Initiative, an ethnic-Croat political party in Serbia
 Hang Seng Index, a stock market index
 Hastings Municipal Airport, in Hastings, Nebraska, United States
 Hispanic-serving institution, an American college designation
 Homeland Security Investigations, U.S. federal law enforcement agency
 Horizon Services, an American rehabilitation clinic
 Humane Society International, nonprofit organization for animal welfare
 Icelandic Handball Association
 Horizontal situation indicator, (aircraft avionics)

See also